Gideon Ireri  was an Anglican bishop in Kenya: in 1997 he became the inaugural Bishop of Mbeere. and served to 2009.

References

21st-century Anglican bishops of the Anglican Church of Kenya
Anglican bishops of Mbeere